Marcel Reuter (born 25 March 1982 in Neunkirchen) is a German professional badminton player. In 2005, Reuter represented University of Saarbrücken became the champion of the European Universities Badminton Championships in men's singles event. In 2012, he won the Banuinvest International tournament in Romania.

Career highlights

Tournament wins
Banuinvest International 2012

Other
2006 - Van Zundert Veto Dutch Open International: Men's singles (quarter final)
2006 - Van Zundert Veto Dutch Open International: Men's doubles (quarter final)

References

External links
IBF Profile

German male badminton players
1982 births
Living people